John Croy (23 February 1925 – September 1979) was a Scottish professional footballer who played in the Football League for Northampton Town as a centre half.

References 

1925 births
1979 deaths
Footballers from Falkirk
Scottish footballers
Association football wing halves
English Football League players
Third Lanark A.C. players
Northampton Town F.C. players

Corby Town F.C. players